This is a list of members of the House of Commons of Canada in the 43rd Canadian Parliament.

Members
Party leaders are listed in italics.
Cabinet ministers are listed in boldface.
The Prime Minister is listed in both.
The Speaker is indicated by "()".

Alberta

British Columbia

Manitoba

New Brunswick

Newfoundland and Labrador

Nova Scotia

Ontario

Prince Edward Island

Quebec

Saskatchewan

The Territories

Changes since the 2019 election

Membership changes

Standings

Notes

References 

Members
43
House